1958 Emperor's Cup Final was the 38th final of the Emperor's Cup competition. The final was played at Fujieda Higashi High School Ground in Shizuoka on September 9, 1958. Kwangaku Club won the championship.

Overview
Kwangaku Club won the championship, by defeating Yawata Steel 2–1.

Match details

See also
1958 Emperor's Cup

References

Emperor's Cup
1958 in Japanese football